Canal Cheong Jagerroos (born 1968) is a Chinese contemporary artist. Brought up in an artistic family in Macau, Cheong Jagerroos works primarily in abstract painting and installations. Her works have been exhibited worldwide since the 1980s. While Cheong Jagerroos is best known for her more traditional multi-layered rice-paper abstract paintings, her later works are based on conceptual art. Her art is infused with ancient metaphoric symbols, signs, and contemporary expressions.

She currently splits her time living and working between Helsinki, Shanghai, Nice, Berlin and Tokyo.

Personal life 
Canal Cheong Jagerroos was born in an artistic family and grew up in Macau. Her father was an artist, and her mother an opera singer. Ever since she was a little girl she wanted to be an artist. She was taught the Chinese traditional painting at an early age, particularly by her father. Cheong Jagerroos' father played an important role in her artistic education infusing in her the strong basis of traditional Chinese art and the tradition shapes. She married Finnish-Swedish Johan Jägerroos in 1991, whom she met in 1987 when studying at Guangzhou Academy of Fine Arts in China and Jägerroos was studying Chinese at Sun Yat-sen University. Together they have two children, their son was born in France and their daughter in Switzerland. During the past 30 years, Cheong Jagerroos has lived and worked in numerous countries in Asia, Europe as well as in Africa. The experiences she has acquired from living in the culturally diverse cities of Hong Kong, Shanghai, Strasbourg, Zürich, Trieste, Dakar, and Helsinki has influenced her professional work.

Education 
Cheong Jagerroos studied courses in fine art at the Guangzhou Academy of Fine Arts. She further studied courses in painting, Chinese painting, oil painting, contemporary art, applying art and experimental art, among other courses. She finished these courses in 1989 and returned to Macau, only to soon resume her artistic studies in Hong Kong, studying art and graphic design at the Open University of Hong Kong for one year.

Artistic style 
Cheong Jagerroos incorporates multi-layered paintings, drawings, signs, symbols, mix-media and calligraphy to depict the cumulative effects of urban changes with a contemporary expression. She combines Chinese traditional techniques and with giant abstract compositions.   Cheong Jagerroos has been a citizen of western and eastern cities, which informs her artistic creations. Westerners easily spot the abundance of Chinese elements, such as calligraphy, in her work, however, the rice-papers and collage she also uses are more difficult to notice. "Her unique constructive, deconstructive, and reconstructive technique is in fact extremely complicated and sophisticated" commented Crystal  Xu, Chief Curator and Manager at the Beijing Being 3 Gallery. 

Under the influence of two philosophers, Bada Shanren (1626-1705) and Laozi (530 BC), she finds inspiration upon observing the laws and development of nature, the contemporary social issues as well as in being authentic to herself and to her own personal feelings.

Public exhibitions

References

Further reading 
 Selected Paintings Of Canal Cheong Jagerroos /  (in Chinese, Portuguese and English). Published by Rui Cunha Foundation & Instituto Cultural de Macau.  (paperback);  (hardcover).

External links 
 

1968 births
Living people
21st-century Chinese women artists
21st-century Chinese painters
Chinese women painters
Place of birth missing (living people)